Åke Ossian Gunnar Backström (30 May 1919 – 8 June 2005) was a Finnish diplomat, a  licentiated in law. He was an Ambassador in Canberra from 1975 to 1980, a negotiating officer from the Foreign Ministry from 1980 to 1983 and Ambassador to Sofia in 1983–1986.

He was born in Tampere and died in Helsinki.

References 

Ambassadors of Finland to Australia
Ambassadors of Finland to Bulgaria
1919 births
2005 deaths
People from Tampere